Donald Davy O'Dowd (born January 23, 1927) is an American academic. He was the president of the University of Alaska System from 1984 to 1990 and also a former president and chancellor of Oakland University. O'Dowd was a Fulbright Scholar, having attended Dartmouth College. He also attended Harvard University, where he earned a Ph.D. in social psychology.

References

1927 births
Alumni of the University of Edinburgh
Dartmouth College alumni
Harvard University alumni
Living people
Oakland University people
People from Manchester, New Hampshire
Presidents of the University of Alaska System